Till varje leende, en tår is an album from Swedish pop singer Cecilia Vennersten, released in 1997. Many songs on the album are in the singer/songwriter genre, compared to her first album; Vennersten wrote much of the music herself.

Track listing
Om du ändå förstod
Vänd dig aldrig om
Hur har vi hamnat här
Allt som jag vill ha
Lever för dig
Minnena består
Stanna här hos mig
Saker som man gör
Någonting hände
Längtar hem

References

External links

1997 albums
Cecilia Vennersten albums
Swedish-language albums